Thomas Villiers, 1st Earl of Clarendon, PC (1709 – 11 December 1786) was a British politician and diplomat from the Villiers family.

Clarendon was the second son of William Villiers, 2nd Earl of Jersey, and his wife Judith Herne, daughter of Frederick Herne.

Political career
Villiers received his education at Eton College and then Queens' College, Cambridge. Following his graduation, he became a diplomat.

Villiers became the British envoy to both the Polish–Lithuanian Commonwealth and the Electorate of Saxony from 1740 to 1747. At the time both realms were in personal union under Augustus III of Poland. He was also sent to Vienna, capital of the Archduchy of Austria, as an envoy to the court of Maria Theresa of Austria from 1742 to 1743. He was last sent to Berlin, capital of the Kingdom of Prussia, as an envoy to the court of Frederick II of Prussia from 1746 to 1748.

Villiers was also involved in domestic politics as a member of the British Whig Party, which at the time dominated the Parliament of Great Britain. He was elected to Parliament in the 1747 British general election. He sat as a Member of Parliament for Tamworth from 1747 to 1756. He retired from all diplomatic offices at this time.

He was a Lord Commissioner of the Admiralty, one of seven members of the Board of Admiralty exercising command over the Royal Navy from 26 February 1748 to 17 November 1756. He served under First Lords of the Admiralty John Montagu, 4th Earl of Sandwich, and George Anson, 1st Baron Anson throughout his term.

On 3 June 1756, the barony of Hyde held by his wife's ancestors the Earls of Clarendon was revived. Villiers was raised to the peerage as Baron Hyde of Hindon in the County of Wiltshire.

Hyde served as Postmaster General from 1763 to 1765. On 9 September 1763, he was admitted to the Privy Council.  He also served as Chancellor of the Duchy of Lancaster from 1771 to 1782 and again from 1783 to 1786.

On 14 June 1776 the earldom of Clarendon, which had become extinct with the death of Henry Hyde, 4th Earl of Clarendon in 1753, was revived and Hyde was made Earl of Clarendon. In 1782 he was also made a Baron of the Kingdom of Prussia, an honour which he received Royal licence to use in Kingdom of Great Britain.

Clarendon returned to the office of Postmaster-General in commission with Henry Carteret, 1st Baron Carteret, in September 1786. This was to be his final political assignment.

Lord Clarendon died in December 1786, aged 77. He was succeeded in the earldom by his eldest son Thomas.

Family

On 30 March 1752 he married Charlotte Capell, daughter of William Capell, 3rd Earl of Essex, and his wife Jane Hyde, daughter of Henry Hyde, 4th Earl of Clarendon (of the 1661 creation) and Jane Leveson-Gower. They had four children:

Thomas Villiers, 2nd Earl of Clarendon (25 December 1753 – 7 March 1824).
John Villiers, 3rd Earl of Clarendon (14 November 1757 – 22 December 1838).
George Villiers (23 November 1759 – 21 March 1827). Father of George Villiers, 4th Earl of Clarendon.
Lady Charlotte Barbara Villiers (27 March 1761 – 9 April 1810).

He bought and remodelled The Grove, a country house near Watford, Hertfordshire.

References

External links
His profile in the Peerage.com
Burke's Peerage

 

1709 births
1786 deaths
Alumni of Queens' College, Cambridge
British MPs 1747–1754
British MPs 1754–1761
Chancellors of the Duchy of Lancaster
1
Lords of the Admiralty
Viliers, Thomas
Members of the Privy Council of Great Britain
People educated at Eton College
United Kingdom Postmasters General
Thomas Villiers, 1st Earl of Clarendon
Villiers, Thomas
Ambassadors of Great Britain to Poland
Ambassadors of Great Britain to the Holy Roman Emperor